Curwin is a surname and given name. Notable people with the name include:

Surname 
 Julie Curwin (active 21st century), Canadian psychiatrist and writer
 Richard Curwin (1944–2018), American university lecturer

Given name 
 Curwin Bosch (born 1997), South African rugby union player
 Curwin Friesen (born 20th century), Canadian company president
 Curwin Gertse (active 21st century), South African rugby union player

See also
 Curwen (surname)